Acacia alexandri is a shrub belonging to the genus Acacia and the subgenus Phyllodineae native to north western Australia.

Description
It has slender branchlets with spinose stipules that are  that are not common on mature plants. It blooms from August to September and produces cream flowers.

Taxonomy
The species was first formally described by Bruce Maslin in 1992 as part of the work Acacia Miscellany. Review of Acacia victoriae and related species (Leguminosae: Mimosoideae: Section Phyllodineae) as published in the journal Nuytsia. The only synonym is Racosperma alexandri as described by Leslie Pedley in 2003.

Distribution
It is native to a small area in the Gascoyne region of Western Australia around Cape Range where it is found on rocky limestone hillsides as part of mallee shrubland communities growing in rocky pink loamy soils.

See also
List of Acacia species

References

alexandri
Acacias of Western Australia
Plants described in 1992
Taxa named by Bruce Maslin